Liam Byrne may refer to:
Liam Byrne, British politician
Liam Byrne (rugby league), Irish rugby league player
Liam Byrne (Irish criminal), Irish criminal